Statistics of Primera División Uruguaya for the 1998 season.

Overview
It was contested by 12 teams, and Nacional won the championship.

Apertura

Clausura

Overall

References
Uruguay – List of final tables (RSSSF)

Uruguayan Primera División seasons
Uru
1998 in Uruguayan football